Carcoar was an electoral district of the Legislative Assembly in the Australian state of New South Wales, originally created in 1859 to the southwest of Bathurst and named after Carcoar. It replaced part of Western Boroughs and part of Bathurst (County). From 1880 to 1894, it elected two members. It was abolished in 1894 and was partly replaced by Cowra.

Members for Carcoar

Election results

References

Former electoral districts of New South Wales
Constituencies established in 1859
Constituencies disestablished in 1894
1859 establishments in Australia
1894 disestablishments in Australia